Unforgettable is an album by American jazz guitarist Joe Pass, released posthumously in 1998.

All tracks on this album are performed on a nylon string classical guitar, and are from the same 1992 session that produced Songs for Ellen.

Reception
Jim Ferguson (JazzTimes) said of Unforgettable:  "Musicians will marvel at Pass' innovative solo voice, facility, and encyclopedic array of harmonic devices, while casual listeners will be soothed by the session's gentle mood. Overall, a vivid look at one facet of the greatest jazz guitarist since Wes Montgomery."

Track listing
"My Romance" (Lorenz Hart, Richard Rodgers) – 3:55
"The Very Thought Of You" (Ray Noble) – 4:10
"I Cover the Waterfront" (Johnny Green, Edward Heyman) – 4:13
"Isn't it Romantic" (Hart, Rodgers) – 3:08
"Walkin' My Baby Back Home" (Fred E. Ahlert, Roy Turk) – 2:39
"Autumn Leaves" (Joseph Kosma, Johnny Mercer, Jacques Prévert) – 2:29
"'Round Midnight" (Bernie Hanighen, Thelonious Monk, Cootie Williams) – 5:15
"I Should Care" (Sammy Cahn, Axel Stordahl, Paul Weston) – 3:27
"Unforgettable" (Irving Gordon) – 2:14
"Don't Worry 'bout Me" (Rube Bloom, Ted Koehler) – 4:06
"Spring Is Here" (Hart, Rodgers) – 3:22
"Moonlight In Vermont" (John Blackburn, Karl Suessdorf) – 3:26
"April In Paris" (Vernon Duke, E. Y. Harburg) – 3:35
"Stardust" (Hoagy Carmichael, Mitchell Parish) – 3:25
"You'll Never Know" (Mack Gordon, Harry Warren) – 2:37
"After You've Gone" (Henry Creamer, Turner Layton) – 2:30
"I Can't Believe You're In Love With Me" (Gaskill, McHugh) – 2:54

Personnel
 Joe Pass - Acoustic Guitar
 Angel Balestier - Digital Editing, Transfers
 George Horn - Mastering
 David Luke - Digital Editing, Transfers
 Bill Milkowski - Liner Notes
 Eric Miller - Producer
 Jamie Putnam - Art Direction
 Yakao - Photography

References

1998 albums
Joe Pass albums
Pablo Records albums
Albums published posthumously